The uKhahlamba-Drakensberg Park is a protected area in the KwaZulu-Natal province of South Africa, covering , and is part of the Maloti-Drakensberg Park, a World Heritage Site. The park includes Royal Natal National Park, a provincial park, and covers part of the Drakensberg, an escarpment formation with the highest elevations in southern Africa.

The park and the adjoining Sehlabathebe National Park in the Kingdom of Lesotho are part of the Maloti-Drakensberg Park, which was first declared a World Heritage Site on 30 November 2000. It is described by UNESCO as having "exceptional natural beauty in its soaring basaltic buttresses, incisive dramatic cutbacks, and golden sandstone ramparts... the site’s diversity of habitats protects a high level of endemic and globally threatened species, especially birds and plants... [and it] also contains many caves and rock-shelters with the largest and most concentrated group of paintings in Africa south of the Sahara". The paintings mentioned are parietal art, some of which may date to 40,000 or 100,000 years ago. 

Plans to boost tourism in the area include a long-awaited cable car project by the KZN Economic Development, Tourism, and Environmental Affairs Department.

Fauna
The Drakensberg area is characterised by a high level of endemism of both vertebrates and invertebrates.

Conservation

Most of the higher South African parts of the Drakensberg escarpment formation have been designated as game reserves or wilderness areas. The uKhahlamba-Drakensberg Park is also in the List of Wetlands of International Importance (under the Ramsar Convention). Adjacent to the park is the Cathkin Estates Conservation and Wildlife Sanctuary, which spans  of virgin grassland and represents the largest privately-owned game park in the KwaZulu-Natal Drakensberg region.

Wilderness areas include Mkhomazi, Upper Mkhomazi, Mlambonja, Mdedelelo, and Mzimkhulu. Mkhomazi Wilderness Area is a region of deserted badlands in the Drakensberg, lying between the Giant's Castle and the Sani Pass.

References

External links

Maloti-Drakensberg Park World Heritage Site list entry at UNESCO
 Drakensberg hiking trails

World Heritage Sites in South Africa
Ramsar sites in South Africa
Ezemvelo KZN Wildlife Parks